This is a list of Prosecutors General of Russia.

Prosecutors General of the Russian Empire
 Count Pavel Yaguzhinsky (12 January 1722 – 6 April 1736)
 Prince Nikita Trubetskoy (28 April 1740 – 15 August 1760)
 Prince Yakov Shakhovsky (15 August 1760 – 25 December 1761)
 Aleksandr Glebov (25 December 1761 – 3 February 1764)
 Prince Alexander Vyazemsky (3 February 1764 – 17 September 1792)
 Count Alexander Samoylov (17 September 1792 – 4 December 1796)
 Prince Alexei Kurakin (4 December 1796 – 8 August 1798)
 Prince Pyotr Lopukhin (8 August 1798 – 7 July 1799)
  (7 July 1799 – 2 February 1800)
 Pyotr Obolyaninov (2 February 1800 – 16 March 1801)
 Alexander Bekleshov (16 March 1801 – 8 September 1802)

Prosecutors General and Ministers of Justice

Prosecutors General of Provisional Government

Prosecutors General of the Union of Soviet Socialist Republics
 Pyotr Krasikov (15 March 1924 – 20 June 1933)
 Ivan Akulov (20 June 1933 – 3 March 1935)
 Andrey Vyshinsky (3 March 1935 – 31 May 1939)
 Mikhail Pankratyev (31 May 1939 – 7 August 1940)
 Viktor Bochkov (7 August 1940 – 11 March 1943)
 Konstantin Gorshenin (12 March 1943 – 4 February 1948, from 1946—Procurator General of the USSR)
 Gregory Safonov (5 February 1948 – 8 August 1953)
 Roman Rudenko (8 August 1953 – 23 January 1981)
 Alexander Rekunkov (9 February 1981 – 26 May 1988)
 Aleksandr Sukharev (26 May 1988 – 22 September 1990)
 Nikolai Trubin (11 December 1990 – 29 January 1992)

Prosecutors of Soviet Russia 
 Dmitry Kursky (28 May 1922 – 16 January 1928)
 Nikolai Janson (16 January 1928 – May 1929)
 Nikolai Krylenko (May 1929 – 5 May 1931)
 Andrey Vyshinsky (11 May 1931 – 1933)
 Vladimir Antonov-Ovseyenko 25 May 1934 – 25 September 1936)
 Faina Nyurina (14 November 1936 – August 1937, acting)
 Nikolai Rychkov (August 1937 – January 1938)
 Ivan Golyakov (31 January – 14 April 1938)
 Mikhail Pankratyev (20 May 1938 – 31 May 1939)
 Anatoly Volin (25 July 1939 – 25 August 1948)
 Pavel Baranov (31 December 1948 – 13 April 1954)
 Alexei Kruglov (13 April 1954 – 19 August 1963)
 Vladimir Blinov (29 November 1963 – September 1970)
 Boris Kravtsov (21 January 1971 – 12 April 1984)
 Sergei Yemelyanov (26 June 1984 – 28 May 1990)
 Nikolai Trubin (28 May – 11 December 1990)

Prosecutor General of the Russian Federation
Valentin Stepankov (28 February 1991 – 5 October 1993)
Aleksey Kazannik (5 October 1993 – 14 March 1994)
Aleksey Ilyushenko (26 March 1994 – 8 October 1995, acting)
Oleg Gaidanov (8 – 24 October 1995, acting)
Yury Skuratov (24 October 1995 – 2 February 1999)
Vladimir Ustinov (17 May 2000 – 2 June 2006)
Yury Chaika (23 June 2006 – 22 January 2020)
Igor Krasnov (22 January 2020)

See also
List of Justice Ministers of Imperial Russia
Procurator General of the Soviet Union

External links 

  Official site of the Prosecutor General of Russia

Russia, Prosecutor General
Government of Russia
Law enforcement in Russia
Law of Russia